Philosophy: The Quest for Truth is an introductory philosophy textbook, edited by Louis P. Pojman and Lewis Vaughn, in its seventh edition as of May 2008. The book provides a selection of classical and contemporary readings on nineteen key problems in philosophy. Topics covered include the nature of philosophy, the existence of God, immortality, knowledge, logic, the mind-body problem, freewill and determinism, ethics, political philosophy, the meaning of life, abortion, capital punishment, animal rights, and affirmative action.

References

2005 non-fiction books
Philosophy textbooks